The 2021 Metro Radio Music Awards was held at the Hong Kong Convention and Exhibition Centre on 27 December 2021. It recognized the best Cantopop recordings, compositions, and artistes of the eligibility year.

Winners

References

2021 in Hong Kong
2021 music awards